Amis Housee may refer to:

 Amis House (Fordyce, Arkansas)
Amis-Elder House, Crawford, GA, listed on the NRHP in Georgia
Tidwell-Amis-Haynes House, Senoia, GA, listed on the NRHP in Georgia
Amis-Bragg House, Jackson, NC
Rufus Amis House and Mill, Virgilina, NC
Prewitt-Amis-Finney House, Culleoka, TN
Jonathan Amis House, McCains, TN
 Amis House (Rogersville, Tennessee)